Zygonyx is a genus of dragonflies in the family Libellulidae. They are commonly known as cascaders because of their preference for living beside waterfalls and flying through the spray. They lay their eggs in wet dangling roots.

Species
The genus contains the following species:
Zygonyx annika 
Zygonyx asahinai 
Zygonyx atritibiae 
Zygonyx chrysobaphes 
Zygonyx constellatus 
Zygonyx denticulatus 
Zygonyx dionyx 
Zygonyx elisabethae 
Zygonyx eusebia 
Zygonyx flavicosta 
Zygonyx geminuncus 
Zygonyx hova 
Zygonyx ida 
Zygonyx ilia 
Zygonyx immaculata 
Zygonyx iris  - Emerald Cascader
Zygonyx luctifer 
Zygonyx natalensis  - Blue Cascader, Powdered Cascader, Scuffed Cascader
Zygonyx ranavalonae 
Zygonyx regisalberti 
Zygonyx speciosus 
Zygonyx takasago 
Zygonyx torridus  - Ringed Cascader
Zygonyx viridescens

References

Libellulidae
Taxa named by Hermann August Hagen
Anisoptera genera
Taxonomy articles created by Polbot